The third season of One Tree Hill, an American teen drama television series, began airing on October 5, 2005. The season concluded on May 3, 2006, after 22 episodes. It is the final season that aired on The WB television network as it would merge with UPN to form The CW. It is also the final season with Criag Sheffer as Keith Scott. Season three dipped in ratings, averaging 2.8 million viewers weekly.

Overview
This season picks up 3 months after that first day of summer. Senior year is here for most of the characters in Tree Hill- a time to grow up, forget, forgive, dream, learn and love one more time before adulthood comes a knockin. People come together - except Dan, consumed by anger as he tracks down whoever started the fire that almost took his life. Tree Hill is rocked by powerful new events. Haley returns and is willing to fight for her marriage, Peyton finally comes to terms with her secretive adoption and decides to connect with her birth mother, not knowing that she has limited time to do so. Brooke decides to take charge of her senior year by starting a hot new clothing line. An old flame returns to Tree Hill after months of leaving town to reclaim Karen's heart. A cunning redhead named Rachel, the new girl at school, will challenge Dan for the title of worst person in Tree Hill as she creates chaos around Tree Hill High. As senior year is a time for last, it's also for grveieing as tragedy strikes Tree Hill High, and the winners of the cheerleading contest or basketball championships appear meaningless in comparison to who lives...and who doesn't. A wedding filled with shocking reveals, relationship drama, and even a possible death.

Cast and characters

Regular
 Chad Michael Murray as Lucas Scott (21 episodes)
 James Lafferty as Nathan Scott (22 episodes)
 Hilarie Burton as Peyton Sawyer (22 episodes)
 Bethany Joy Galeotti as Haley James Scott (22 episodes)
 Paul Johansson as Dan Scott (20 episodes)
 Sophia Bush as Brooke Davis (22 episodes)
 Barbara Alyn Woods as Deb Scott (13 episodes) 
 Lee Norris as Mouth McFadden (18 episodes)
 Barry Corbin as Whitey Durham (12 episodes)
 Craig Sheffer as Keith Scott (6 episodes)
 Moira Kelly as Karen Roe (20 episodes)

Recurring
 Danneel Harris as Rachel Gatina (19 episodes)
 Bevin Prince as Bevin Mirskey (16 episodes)
 Tyler Hilton as Chris Keller (6 episodes)
 Sheryl Lee as Ellie Harp (8 episodes)
 Antwon Tanner as Antwon "Skills" Taylor (7 episodes)
 Vaughn Wilson as Fergie Thompson (7 episodes) 
 Cullen Moss as Junk Moretti (6 episodes)
 Kevin Kilner as Larry Sawyer (6 episodes)
 Brett Claywell as Tim Smith (5 episodes)
 Kelsey Chow as Gigi Silveri (5 episodes)

Shawn Shepard as Principal Turner (4 episodes)
 Michael Trucco as Cooper Lee (3 episodes)
 Bryan Greenberg as Jake Jagielski (3 episodes)
 Pete Wentz as Pete Wentz (3 episodes)
 Colin Fickes as Jimmy Edwards (2 episodes)
Amber Wallace as Glenda Farrell (1 episode)
 Allison Scagliotti as Abigail "Abby" Brown (1 episode)

Episodes

Ratings

DVD release
The DVD release of season three was released after the season has completed broadcast on television. It has been released in Regions 1, 2 and 4. As well as every episode from the season, the DVD release features bonus material such as audio commentaries on some episodes from the creator and cast, deleted scenes, gag reels and behind-the-scenes featurettes.

References

One Tree Hill (TV series) seasons
2005 American television seasons
2006 American television seasons